The women's 10 metre air rifle competition at the 2002 Asian Games in Busan, South Korea was held on 2 October at the Changwon International Shooting Range.

Schedule
All times are Korea Standard Time (UTC+09:00)

Records

Results
Legend
DNS — Did not start

Qualification

Final

References 

2002 Asian Games Report, Pages 655–657
Qualification Results
Final Results

External links
Official website

Women Rifle 10